Stangeia siceliota is a moth of the family Pterophoridae that is known from Yemen, China and southern Europe. It is also known from Turkey and Armenia.

References

Oxyptilini
Moths described in 1847
Moths of Asia
Moths of the Arabian Peninsula
Moths of Europe
Taxa named by Philipp Christoph Zeller